Ben-Azen (Canaanite for "Son of Azen" or in his Egyptian given name: "Ramesses-em-per-Ra",  meaning "Ramesses in the House of Ra", fl. ca. 1200 BC) was an Asiatic official in the 19th Dynasty of ancient Egypt at the court of Pharaohs Ramses II and his son, Merneptah. Ben-Azen's was titled: "Cup Bearer", meaning he was in a high position stationed next to the kings themselves despite his foreign descent that allegedly should have restricted him to menial tasks.

According to an inscription asserted to him, Ben-Azen had come to Egypt from Northern Jordan, thus he's to be referred to as Canaanite in terms of ethnic background. Like many "butlers" (a term coined to the officials of foreign descent) in the Ramesside era, Ben Azen reflects the Asiatic tone the Royal Court had.

References

Canaan
People of the Nineteenth Dynasty of Egypt